George Herman Spriggs (May 22, 1937 – December 22, 2020) was an outfielder in Major League Baseball who played for the Pittsburgh Pirates and the Kansas City Royals in parts of four seasons spanning 1965–1970.

Spriggs was signed as an amateur free agent prior to the  season by the Pittsburgh Pirates after attending Wiley H. Bates High School in Annapolis, MD.

Previously, Spriggs played for various Negro league clubs, most prominently with the Detroit-New Orleans Stars in 1960.

In 1966, during his minor league career, Spriggs led the International League with 34 stolen bases and hit .300 for the Columbus Jets. Overall, in seasons years with the Jets he stole 170 bases.

In 1967, he was selected by the Boston Red Sox during the Rule 5 draft, but was returned to the Pirates in April 1968 when he did not make the Red Sox major league roster. His contract then was purchased by the Kansas City Royals in the month of October from the Pirates. Afterwards, the New York Mets purchased his contract in 1971, but he never played a major league game with them.

Springs won the 1970 American Association Most Valuable Player Award with the Omaha Royals.

References

Further reading
 "Meet the Silver Sox". Nevada State Journal. May 11, 1963.
 Terrell, Bob (May 27, 1964). "George Spriggs: A Man Who Came to Play". The Asheville Citizen.

External links
, or Pelota Binaria (Venezuelan Winter League)

1937 births
2020 deaths
African-American baseball players
American Association (1902–1997) MVP Award winners
Asheville Tourists players
Baseball players from Maryland
Cardenales de Lara players
American expatriate baseball players in Venezuela
Columbus Jets players
Florida Instructional League Pirates players
Kansas City Monarchs players
Kansas City Royals players
Major League Baseball outfielders
Omaha Royals players
Pittsburgh Pirates players
Reno Silver Sox players
Tidewater Tides players
20th-century African-American sportspeople
21st-century African-American people